Stephen Kwadwo Sarfo (born 25 May 1992) is a Ghanaian professional footballer who plays as a forward.

Club career
In February 2020, Sarfo joined Iraqi club Al-Mina'a. In July 2022, he returned to Lebanese club Tadamon Sour, before promptly moving to his former club Bourj in August of the same year.

International career
Sarfo made his first senior appearance for Ghana on 25 May 2017, in a 1–1 draw in friendly match against Benin.

Honours
Ghana
 WAFU Cup of Nations: 2017

Individual
 WAFU Cup of Nations top-scorer: 2017

References

External links
 
 

1992 births
Living people
Association football forwards
Ghanaian footballers
Ghanaian expatriate footballers
Ghana international footballers
Berekum Chelsea F.C. players
Smouha SC players
Tadamon Sour SC players
Bourj FC players
Al-Mina'a SC players
Ghana Premier League players
Egyptian Premier League players
Lebanese Premier League players
Ghanaian expatriate sportspeople in Lebanon
Ghanaian expatriate sportspeople in Egypt
Ghanaian expatriate sportspeople in Iraq
Expatriate footballers in Egypt
Expatriate footballers in Lebanon
Expatriate footballers in Iraq